Unique Flavor is a Taiwanese Hokkien television drama that began airing on SET Taiwan in Taiwan on 16 August 2006, from Mondays to Fridays, and ended on 19 September 2007, with a total of 286 episodes.

It is directed by Fung Kai, with advisor Zhou You (周游).

The slogan for Unique Flavor is Good, Interesting, True (好味、趣味、真情味).

Cast
The casts are classified according to the families they belong to in the drama.

Chens (Chef Wan's Traditional Flavours)

Lius (Tai Mei Enterprise)

Liaos (King of Soups)

Zhous (Otsu-mi-ya)

Otsu-mi-ya is a Japanese restaurant in the drama with the name in Chinese characters/Kanji "乙味屋". It is pronounced as  おつみや(otsu-mi-ya) in Japanese and Yǐ wèi wū in Mandarin. The Japanese pronunciation was never mentioned in the drama.

Lis (Chang Shun Tea House)

Hongs (Jiu Long House Cuisine Group)

Zhaos

Yangs (Yang Guang Rice)

Domotos (Domoto Fisheries)
Domoto (Japanese: 堂本; Romaji: Dōmoto) is a Japanese surname. Japanese surnames are in Chinese characters or Kanji due to Sinicization in Japan. In Mandarin, the surname is pronounced as Tángběn. All "Japanese" in this drama were in fact acted by Taiwanese actors.

Wangs (Chuang Shi Ji Group)

Luos (Wagyu business)

Gaos (Sushi expert)

Zhangs (First Hotel)

Others

Taiwan broadcast
, the show airs in Taiwan, country of origin of the drama every weeknight at prime time (20:00) with episodes which have ranged in length from 135 to 150 minutes including commercial advertisements.  The producers received funding from the Government Information Office to produce the series in high definition.

International broadcast

Singapore
Due to local broadcast laws prohibiting radio or television broadcasts in Chinese dialects the show was dubbed into Mandarin when it aired on MediaCorp Channel 8 thus making it the first channel to broadcast the show in Mandarin. It was the third Taiwan drama to broadcast the show in Singapore.

Vietnam
The Vietnamese dub "Thiên hạ đệ nhất vị" was broadcast on Vinh Long Television Station Channel (THVL) (Vietnamese: Truyền Hình Vĩnh Long) and is streamable on YouTube. The show was aired on Vietface TV from 1pm-2:30pm (PT), however, it was fully aired as it was replaced with Ghar Ki Lakshmi Betiyann. The show is also currently airing on E Channel.

Malaysia
The drama is broadcasting now in 8TV in original Hokkien language under the English title Unique Flavor for two episodes with one hour each from Monday to Friday, at 11:30 MST and 14:00 MST with a 30 minutes break of its Midday Mandarin News at 12:30 MST.

References

Taiwanese drama television series
2006 Taiwanese television series debuts
2007 Taiwanese television series endings
Hokkien-language television shows
Sanlih E-Television original programming